John Riddle may refer to:

 John Riddle (baseball) (1864–1890), baseball player
 John M. Riddle (born 1937), a scholar who specializes in the history of medicine
 John Paul Riddle (1901–1989), pilot and aviation enthusiast
 John W. Riddle (1864–1941), American diplomat
 Johnny Riddle (1905–1998), baseball player

See also
John Riddell (disambiguation)